Tor Egil Førland (born 5 May 1959) is professor of history at the University of Oslo.

Career
Between 2003 and 2004 Førland was Subdean of education at the Faculty of Humanities at the University of Oslo, responsible for implementing the Quality Reform at the faculty. Førland was Head of education and Deputy head of Department of Archaeology, Conservation and History (IAKH) during 2009–2012. Førland has been Head of Department since 2013.

As a historian, Førland has specialized in the radicalism of the 1960s and 1970s and in contemporary international history. He has published books and articles on the history of the EU, European integration, the Cold War and the 1968 protests.

Førland has also contributed to the debate on objectivity and values in historiography, taking a stance against the postmodern relativization of truth. He has applied the philosopher Peter Railton’s concept of the “ideal explanatory text” to argue that the ideal of objectivity in historiography is attainable.

Select bibliography 
 “Cutting the Sixties Down to Size: Conceptualizing, Historicizing, Explaining”. Journal for the Study of Radicalism 9/2 (2015), pp. 125–148
 “Brought Up to Rebel in the Sixties: Birth Order Irrelevant, Parental Worldview Decisive”. With Trine Rogg Korsvik and Knut-Andreas Christophersen. Political Psychology 33/6 (2012), pp. 825–838
 Cold Economic Warfare: CoCom and the Forging of Export Controls, 1948-1954. Dordrecht: Republic of Letters Publishing, 2009
 “Historiography without God: A Reply to Gregory”. History and Theory 47/4 (2008), pp. 520–532
 “Acts of God? Miracles and Scientific Explanation”. History and Theory 47/4 (2008), pp. 483–494
 “The Ideal Explanatory Text in History: A Plea for Ecumenism”. History and Theory 43/3 (2004), pp. 321–340
 “Far Out: International History in Norway”. Scandinavian Journal of History 20/3 (1995), pp. 167–183
 “Bringing It All Back Home or Another Side of Bob Dylan: Midwestern Isolationist”. Journal of American Studies 26/3 (1992), pp. 337–355
 “‘Selling Firearms to the Indians’: Eisenhower’s Export Control Policy, 1953-54”. Diplomatic History 15/2 (1991), pp. 221–244
 “‘Economic Warfare’ and ‘Strategic Goods’: A Conceptual Framework for Analyzing COCOM”. Journal of Peace Research 28/2 (1991), pp. 191–204
 “An Act of Economic Warfare? The Dispute over NATO's Embargo Resolution, 1950-1951”. The International History Review 12/3 (1990), pp. 490–513

References

External links 
 Tor Egil Førland′s profile page at the University of Oslo

1959 births
Living people
20th-century Norwegian historians
Academic staff of the University of Oslo
21st-century Norwegian historians